Stansted is an airport in Essex, England.

Stansted may also refer to other places in England:
Stansted Mountfitchet, Essex
Stansted, Kent
Stansted Park, West Sussex

See also
Stanstead (disambiguation)